The ilish (Tenualosa ilisha) (also known as the ilishi, hilsa, hilsa herring or hilsa shad, is a species of fish related to the herring, in the family Clupeidae. It is a very popular and sought-after food fish in the Indian Subcontinent, and is the national fish of Bangladesh and the state fish of West Bengal.

The most famous hilsha fish comes from Chandpur, Bangladesh. The fish contributes about 12% of the total fish production and about 1.15% of GDP in Bangladesh. On 6 August 2017, Department of Patents, Designs and Trademarks under the Ministry of Industries of Bangladesh has declared the recognition of ilish as the product of Bangladesh. As of 2021, 86% of the world's total ilish supply originates in Bangladesh which applied for Geographical indication (GI) in 2004. About 450,000 people are directly involved in the catching of the fish as a large part of their livelihood; around four to five million people are indirectly involved with the trade.

Common names
Other names include: jatka, ilish, ellis, palla fish, hilsha, ilih etc. (: ilih/ilihi, : Modar or Palva, Sindhī: پلو مڇي pallo machhi, Telugu: పులస pulasa). The name ilish is also used in India's Assamese, Bengali and Odia community. In Iraq it is called sboor (صبور). In Malaysia and Indonesia, it is commonly known as terubok. Due to its distinguished features as being oily and tender, some Malays, especially in northern Johore, call it '' (to distinguish it from the toli - which species is rich of tiny bones and not so oily).

Description and habitat

The fish is marine; freshwater; brackish; pelagic-neritic; anadromous; depth range? - 200 m. Within a tropical range; 34°N - 5°N, 42°E - 97°E in marine and freshwater. It can grow up to 60 cm in length with weights of up to 3 kg. It is found in rivers and estuaries in Bangladesh, India, Pakistan, Myanmar (also known as Burma) and the Persian Gulf area where it can be found in the Tigris and Euphrates rivers in and around Iran and southern Iraq. It has no dorsal spines but 18 – 21 dorsal soft rays and anal soft rays. The belly has 30 to 33 scutes. There is a distinct median notch in the upper jaw. Gill rakers fine and numerous, about 100 to 250 on the lower part of the arch and the fins are hyaline. The fish shows a dark blotch behind gill opening, followed by a series of small spots along the flank in juveniles. Color in life, silver shot with gold and purple. The species filter feeds on plankton and by grubbing muddy bottoms. The fish schools in coastal waters and ascends up the rivers (anadromous) for around 50 – 100 km to spawn during the southwest monsoons (June to September) and also in January to April. April is the most fertile month for the breeding of ilish. The young fish returning to the sea are known in Bangladesh as jatka, which includes any ilish fish up to 9 inches long.

Production

The fish is found in 11 countries: Bangladesh, India, Myanmar, Pakistan, Iran, Iraq, Kuwait, Bahrain, Indonesia, Malaysia and Thailand. Bangladesh is the top hilsa-producing country in the world, followed by Myanmar and then India. 

86 percent of the total hilsa catch is taken in Bangladesh. Production has dropped in the other ten hilsa-producing countries; in Bangladesh, however, production reached 517,000 tons in FY 2017–18, up from 279,189 tons in 2006–07, as a result of a strategy implemented by the Bangladeshi government.

Food value

The fish is popular food amongst the people of South Asia and in the Middle East, but especially with Bengalis, Odias and Andhras. Bengali fish curry is a popular dish made with mustard oil or seed. The Bengalis popularly call this dish Shorshe Ilish. It is very popular in Bengal (Bangladesh and India's West Bengal), as well as in Odisha, Tripura, Assam, Gujarat and Andhra Pradesh. It is also exported globally.

In North America (where ilish is not always readily available) other shad fish are sometimes used as an ilish substitute, especially in Bengali cuisine. This typically occurs near the East coast of North America, where fresh shad fish having similar taste can be found.

In Bangladesh, fish are caught in the Meghna-Jamuna delta, which flows into the Bay of Bengal and Meghna (lower Brahmaputra), and Jamuna rivers.

In India, Rupnarayan (which has the Kolaghater hilsa), Hooghly, Mahanadi, Narmada and Godavari rivers and the Chilika Lake are famous for their fish yields.

In Pakistan, most hilsa fish are caught in the Indus River Delta in Sindh. They are also caught in the sea, but some consider the marine stage of the fish as not so tasty. The fish has very sharp and tough bones, making it problematic to eat for some.

Ilish is an oily fish rich in omega 3 fatty acids. Recent experiments have shown its beneficial effects in decreasing cholesterol level in rats and insulin level.

In Bengal and Odisha, ilish can be smoked, fried, steamed or baked in young plantain leaves, prepared with mustard seed paste, curd, eggplant, different condiments like jira (cumin) and so on. It is said that people can cook ilish in more than 50 ways. Ilish roe is also popular as a side dish. Ilish can be cooked in very little oil since the fish itself is very oily.

Ilish in culture

 In Andhra Pradesh, the saying goes "Pustelu ammi ayina Pulasa tinocchu", meaning roughly "It's worth eating Pulasa/Ilish even if you have to sell your mangala sutra.
 In many Bengali Hindu families a pair of ilish fishes (Bengali: Jora Ilish) are bought on auspicious days, for example for special prayers or puja days like for the Hindu Goddess of music, art and knowledge Saraswati Puja, which takes place in the beginning of Spring or on the day of Lakshmi Puja (The Goddess of Wealth and Prosperity) which takes place in autumn. Some people offer the fish to the goddess Lakshmi, without which the Puja is sometimes thought to be incomplete.
 Ilish is the national fish of Bangladesh.
 In Bengal Ilish is also used during wedding as tattwa gift. During Gaye Holud tattwa the family of the groom presents a pair of Ilish to the family of the bride. However, due to the scarcity of Ilish, nowadays it is often replaced by Rohu in West Bengal, while the tradition continues in Bangladesh.
 In Bangladesh and West Bengal, a famous dish which tastes good with fried ilish fish is 'khichudi' (a special way of cooking lentils and rice together with some added herbs). It is popular among all Bengalis during monsoon which is known as the month of ilish. In Bangladesh and West Bengal, ilish is often termed as the 'Queen' of fishes.
 This fish is called as PULASA in Godavari districts of Andhra Pradesh State in India. The name Pulasa stays with the fish for a limited period between July-Sept of a year, when floods (muddy) water flow in Godavari River. This time the fish is in high demand and sometimes $100 per kilo.
 Hilsha fish called Pallo Machi is important part of Sindhi cuisine, prepared with numerous cooking methods. It can be deep fried and garnished with local spices, can be cooked with onions and potatoes into a traditional fish meal or barbequed. The fish often has roe, which is called "aani" in Sindhi and is enjoyed as a delicacy. Often fried alongside the palla and served with the fish fillets.
 The rivalry of Eastbengal and Mohonbagan, two football clubs in Kolkata are celebrated by food. When Eastbengal prevails, its an Ilish dish which is cooked in the household of a fan. Similarly, when Mohonbagan wins, a prawn dish is prepared by the supporter.

Overfishing and possible extinction
Due to the demand and popularity of this species, overfishing is rampant. Fishes weighing around 2 to 3 kilograms have become rare in India, as even the smaller fish are caught using finer fishing nets as production in Bangladesh have increased. As a consequence of this, prices of the fish have risen. In the past ilish were not harvested between Vijaya Dashami and Saraswati Puja due to some informal customs of Odia and Bengali Hindus as it is the breeding period of the fish. But as disposable incomes grew, wealthier consumers abandoned the old traditions. The advent of finer fishing nets and advanced trawling techniques, and environmental degradation of the rivers, has worsened the situation. Fishermen have been ignoring calls to at least leave the juvenile "jatka" alone to repopulate the species. The fishing of the young jatka is now illegal in Bangladesh. This ban however has resulted in a rise in un-employment, as around 83,000 fishermen are unable to pursue their former livelihood for eight months every year. It has also led to the creation of a black market where jatka are sold for exorbitant prices. Furthermore, the changes brought about by global warming have led to a gradual depletion of the ilish's breeding grounds, reducing populations of the fish even further. Pollution in Indian rivers have worsened the situation, but due to slightly better waters the fishes are found more near Bangladesh delta. Owing to this situation ilish is used as a diplomatic trade item for COVID-19 vaccines too.

See also
 Bangladeshi cuisine
 Bengali cuisine
 Cuisine of Odisha
 Environmental impact of fishing

References

External links

 Hilsa Research in the Bay of Bengal
 Tenualosa ilisha.BdFISH
 
 Ilish Hut (ইলিশ হাট) | Online Ilish Fish Selling Website from Bangladesh
 
 

Tenualosa
Fish described in 1822
Andhra cuisine
Odia cuisine
Bengali cuisine
Fish of Bangladesh
National symbols of Bangladesh
Commercial fish
Taxa named by Francis Buchanan-Hamilton